Boris Mikhailovich Volin (born: Josif Yefimovich Fradkin; 13 June 1886 – 15 February 1957) was a Soviet historian, journalist and politician.

He was born to a Jewish family in Hlybokaye, Disnensky Uyezd, Vilna Governorate (now Hlybokaye District, Vitebsk Region, Belarus). He published Questions of History and campaigned against alcohol consumption. He was a member of the Central Committee elected by the 17th Congress of the All-Union Communist Party (Bolsheviks). He was head of the School Department from 13 May 1935 to 1936. Volin was director of the Main Administration for Literary and Publishing Affairs (Glavit) from July 1931 to 1935. He was awarded the Order of the Patriotic War. He was a researcher at the Marx-Engels-Lenin Institute as well as a professor at the Moscow State University. He died in Moscow ad was buried at the Novodevichy Cemetery.

See also
 List of mayors of Kharkiv

References

Sources
 Lenin w Powolschje (Lenin in der Wolgaregion) 1870 bis 1893, 2. Bände, Moskau 1956.

External links
Artikel in der Großen Sowjetischen Enzyklopädie

1886 births
1957 deaths
People from Hlybokaye
People from Disnensky Uyezd
Russian Social Democratic Labour Party members
Old Bolsheviks
Jewish socialists
Soviet journalists
Soviet politicians
Soviet historians
Soviet partisans
Censorship in the Soviet Union
Anti-liquor activists
Soviet health activists
20th-century journalists
Recipients of the Order of Lenin
Burials at Novodevichy Cemetery
Mayors of Kharkiv